The Silver Greyhound is a 1919 British silent film directed by Bannister Merwin and starring James Knight, Marjorie Villis and Mary Dibley.

Cast
 James Knight as John Vane  
 Marjorie Villis as Nancy Lisle  
 Mary Dibley as Lady Chalmore  
 Frank Petley as The Master  
 Jeff Barlow 
 Clifford Pembroke 
 Charles Ashley as Lord Chalmore  
 Dallas Cairns
 Hamilton Stewart 
 Frank Gerrard

References

Bibliography
 Low, Rachael. The History of British Film The History of the British Film 1914 - 1918. Routledge, 2013.

External links
 

1919 films
British silent feature films
Films directed by Bannister Merwin
Films set in England
British black-and-white films
1910s English-language films